Ghum may refer to:
 Another spelling for the city Qom in Iran
 Ghum, West Bengal, a small hilly locality in the Darjeeling Himalayan hill region of West Bengal, India
 Ghum Monastery, Buddhist
 GHUM, the London-based post punk band